Bangalor East may refer to:

Bangalore East railway station
Bangalore East (Taluk)